Yungera may refer to:
Yungera railway line in Victoria, Australia
Yungera, Victoria, the former town at the terminus of the railway
Yungerā, the Japanese name of the Pokémon species known as Kadabra in the rest of the world